The eleventh series of the British television drama series Grange Hill began broadcasting on 5 January 1988, before ending on 11 March 1988 on BBC One. The series follows the lives of the staff and pupils of the eponymous school, an inner-city London comprehensive school. It consists of twenty episodes.

Cast and characters

Pupils

Staff

Episodes

{| class="wikitable" style="width:100%;"
|-
! style="background-color: #333333; color:white"| No.
! style="background: #333333; color:white"| Episode
! style="background: #333333; color:white"| Writer
! style="background: #333333; color:white"| Director
! style="background: #333333; color:white"| Original airdate
|-
| align="center"| 1
| align="center"| Episode One
| align="center"| Chris Ellis
| align="center"| Albert Barber
| align="center"| 5 January 1988
|-
| style="background:white" colspan="5" |As the school gates open for a new school year, Ziggy and Robbie wish it was still the summer holidays
|- style="background:#333333; height:2px"
| colspan="5" |
|-

| align="center"| 2
| align="center"| Episode Two
| align="center"| Chris Ellis
| align="center"| Albert Barber
| align="center"| 8 January 1988
|-
| style="background:white" colspan="5" |Chrissy wants to be famous. Matthew decides to skip class.
|- style="background:#333333; height:2px"
| colspan="5" |
|-

| align="center"| 3
| align="center"| Episode Three
| align="center"| David Angus
| align="center"| Albert Barber
| align="center"|12 January 1988
|-
| style="background:white" colspan="5" |Ziggy and Robbie find themselves becoming involved in Gonch's latest money making scheme. Mr Bronson is shocked by Helen's excuse for not having done her homework.
|- style="background:#333333; height:2px"
| colspan="5" |
|-

| align="center"| 4
| align="center"| Episode Four
| align="center"| David Angus
| align="center"| Albert Barber
| align="center"| 15 January 1988
|-
| style="background:white" colspan="5" |Ronnie is taken to see some hip hop being performed by her new friend Fiona. Georgina is upset when Mauler tries to kiss her.
|- style="background:#333333; height:2px"
| colspan="5" |
|-

| align="center"| 5
| align="center"| Episode Five
| align="center"| David Angus
| align="center"| John Smith
| align="center"|19 January 1988
|-
| style="background:white" colspan="5" |Matthew lies about what happened over the weekend. Tegs attempts to get even with Mauler.

|- style="background:#333333; height:2px"
| colspan="5" |
|-

| align="center"| 6
| align="center"| Episode Six
| align="center"| David Angus
| align="center"| John Smith
| align="center"| 22 January 1988
|-
| style="background:white" colspan="5" |Gonch's money making scheme causes problems for himself.
|- style="background:#333333; height:2px"
| colspan="5" |
|-

| align="center"| 7
| align="center"| Episode Seven
| align="center"| Sarah Daniels
| align="center"| John Smith
| align="center"| 26 January 1988
|-
| style="background:white" colspan="5" |Things go wrong when Mauler attempts to gain revenge on Tegs. Helen has a secret which she isn't telling anybody.
|- style="background:#333333; height:2px"
| colspan="5" |
|-

| align="center"| 8
| align="center"| Episode Eight
| align="center"| Sarah Daniels
| align="center"| John Smith
| align="center"| 29 January 1988
|-
| style="background:white" colspan="5" |Laura isn't happy when she learns her mother has a new boyfriend. Mr Bronson gets even with Mauler.
|- style="background:#333333; height:2px"
| colspan="5" |
|-

| align="center"| 9
| align="center"| Episode Nine
| align="center"| Margaret Simpson
| align="center"| Robert Gabriel
| align="center"| 2 February 1988
|-
| style="background:white" colspan="5" |Ronnie and Fiona practice their hip hop routine they have been working on. Danny offers to provide the sounds for them.
|- style="background:#333333; height:2px"
| colspan="5" |
|-

| align="center"| 10
| align="center"| Episode Ten
| align="center"| Margaret Simpson
| align="center"| Robert Gabriel
| align="center"|5 February 1988
|-
| style="background:white" colspan="5" |Freddie isn't happy when he learns he will have to learn dance instead of playing football. The boys decide to do something about Mauler.
|- style="background:#333333; height:2px"
| colspan="5" |
|-

| align="center"| 11
| align="center"| Episode Eleven
| align="center"| Margaret Simpson
| align="center"| Robert Gabriel
| align="center"| 9 February 1988
|-
| style="background:white" colspan="5" |Gonch finds himself in trouble. Chrissy and Susi's badge idea becomes a craze around the school.
|- style="background:#333333; height:2px"
| colspan="5" |
|-

| align="center"| 12
| align="center"| Episode Twelve
| align="center"| David Angus
| align="center"| Albert Barber
| align="center"| 12 February 1988 
|-
| style="background:white" colspan="5" |Ronnie and Fiona enter the hip hop competition. Mrs Reagan throws a dinner party. Ronnie borrows some money from her mother without telling her.
|- style="background:#333333; height:2px"
| colspan="5" |
|-

| align="center"| 13
| align="center"| Episode Thirteen
| align="center"| Kay Trainer
| align="center"| Albert Barber
| align="center"| 16 February 1988
|-
| style="background:white" colspan="5" |Mr McKenzie is worried about Matthew. Laura isn't happy with Simon's actions after she learns from Julia what he tried to do.
|- style="background:#333333; height:2px"
| colspan="5" |
|-

| align="center"| 14
| align="center"| Episode Fourteen
| align="center"| Barry Purchese
| align="center"| Albert Barber
| align="center"| 19 February 1988
|-
| style="background:white" colspan="5" |Tegs takes Justine to tea at his aunt’s house but it turns out not to be his aunt’s house after all. Freddie is upset that Mr Robson isn't picking the best players for the school's football team.
|- style="background:#333333; height:2px"
| colspan="5" |
|-

| align="center"| 15
| align="center"| Episode Fifteen
| align="center"| Barry Purchese
| align="center"| Albert Barber
| align="center"| 23 February 1988
|-
| style="background:white" colspan="5" |Ziggy gets a group together to help deal with Mauler, but Mr. Griffiths ends up getting in the way. Ronnie is tempted into shoplifting but ends up getting caught.
|- style="background:#333333; height:2px"
| colspan="5" |
|-

| align="center"| 16
| align="center"| Episode Sixteen
| align="center"| Barry Purchese
| align="center"| John Smith
| align="center"| 26 February 1988
|-
| style="background:white" colspan="5" |Matthew tells Mr. Mackenzie about his drunken father. Calley and the girls decide to own up about their shoplifting in an effort to help Ronnie. 
|- style="background:#333333; height:2px"
| colspan="5" |
|-
| align="center"| 17
| align="center"| Episode Seventeen
| align="center"| Barry Purchese
| align="center"| John Smith
| align="center"| 1 March 1988
|-
| style="background:white" colspan="5" |Gonch starts a new baby sitting business with Ziggy, but first he needs to get them some temporary girlfriends. The girls own up to Mrs McCluskey about their shoplifting.
|- style="background:#333333; height:2px"
| colspan="5" |
|-

| align="center"| 18
| align="center"| Episode Eighteen
| align="center"| Barry Purchese
| align="center"| John Smith
| align="center"|4 March 1988
|-
| style="background:white" colspan="5" |The girls learn a tough lesson from Mrs McCluskey about shop lifting. Both Calley and Robbie get ready to go on their first date together but when Calley is late Robbie thinks he has been stood up.
|- style="background:#333333; height:2px"
| colspan="5" |
|-

| align="center"| 19
| align="center"| Episode Nineteen
| align="center"| Margaret Simpson
| align="center"| John Smith
| align="center"| 8 March 1988
|-
| style="background:white" colspan="5" |The police issue Ronnie with a caution. Efforts to finally get Calley and Robbie together don't go to plan.
|- style="background:#333333; height:2px"
| colspan="5" |
|-

| align="center"| 20
| align="center"| Episode Twenty
| align="center"| Margaret Simpson
| align="center"|Robert Gabriel
| align="center"| 11 March 1988
|-
| style="background:white" colspan="5" |It's "Wear What You Like" day on the final day of term. Mauler's gang have one last chance to get even with Ziggy before he may leave the school for good.
|- style="background:#333333; height:2px"
| colspan="5" |
|-
|}

Release History
As of 2022, The eleventh series of Grange Hill has not been released on DVD 

In July 2022, the eleventh series was added to the streaming platform BritBox

Notes

References

1988 British television seasons
Grange Hill